Philip Pearson is a basketball coach.

Philip Pearson may also refer to:
Philip Pearson (tennis)
 Philip Pearson, character in Travelers (TV series)